McElhinney is a surname of Irish origin. It may refer to:

Andrew Repasky McElhinney (born 1979), American film producer born in Philadelphia
Curtis McElhinney (born 1983), Canadian professional ice hockey goaltender
Gerry McElhinney (born 1956), Irish sportsman who played Gaelic football, soccer and was also a boxer
Hayley McElhinney (born 1974) Australian actress
Ian McElhinney (born 1948), Northern Irish actor and director
Mandy McElhinney, Australian actress appearing in the TV sketch comedy series Comedy Inc
Robert McElhinney (1747–1831), Irish-born political figure in Nova Scotia

See also
McElhenney
McIlhenny

References